Lajos Baróti (19 August 1914 – 23 December 2005) was a Hungarian football player and manager. With eleven major titles he is one of the outstanding coaches of his era.

Career
Baróti played from 1928 until 1946 for Szegedi AK and from 1946 to 1948 Győri ETO. Between 1939 and 1941 he also played twice for the national team.

1957 he was appointed head coach of the national team. Until 1966 and between 1975 and 1978 he led the side through 117 matches. He led Hungary to the World Cups of 1958, 1962, 1966 and 1978. At the Olympics of 1960 in Rome and the 1964 European Nations' Cup the team finished third. The greatest success was the winning of the gold medal at the 1964 Olympics in Tokyo.

Between 1971 and 1972 he had a stint as coach of the Peruvian national team: in 1971 he led the Peru olympic team during the Pre-Olympic Tournament.

His most successful time as club coach was from 1967 and 1971 with Újpesti Dózsa in Budapest, where he laid the beginnings of the club's golden era. The front row consisting of Fazekas – Göröcs – Bene – Dunai II – Zámbó was one of the finest of the 1970s. He took the club to doubles of cup and championship in 1969 and 1970 as well as to a third consecutive championship in 1971, the first titles for the club in a decade. He also took the club to the finals of the Inter-Cities Fairs Cup of 1968–69 against Newcastle United, however losing there 0–3 and 2–3.

Baróti enjoyed further successes with Vasas SC, SSW Innsbruck in Austria and S.L. Benfica, there winning a Portuguese Supercup in 1980 and a double in 1981.

Honours

Club
Vasas SC
Nemzeti Bajnokság I: 1957
Magyar Kupa: 1973
Újpesti Dózsa
Nemzeti Bajnokság I: 1969, 1970, 1971
Magyar Kupa: 1969, 1970
Innsbruck
Austrian Cup: 1978–79
Benfica
Primeira Liga: 1980–81
Taça de Portugal: 1980–81

International
Hungary
1964 Summer Olympics gold medal: 1964

References

External links
 

1914 births
2005 deaths
Sportspeople from Szeged
Hungarian footballers
Hungary international footballers
Szeged LC footballers
Győri ETO FC players
Hungarian football managers
Hungarian expatriate football managers
1958 FIFA World Cup managers
1962 FIFA World Cup managers
1964 European Nations' Cup managers
1966 FIFA World Cup managers
1978 FIFA World Cup managers
Győri ETO FC managers
Budapesti VSC managers
Vasas SC managers
Hungary national football team managers
Újpest FC managers
Peru national football team managers
Hungarian expatriate sportspeople in Peru
Expatriate football managers in Peru
FC Wacker Innsbruck managers
Hungarian expatriate sportspeople in Austria
S.L. Benfica managers
Hungarian expatriate sportspeople in Portugal
Expatriate football managers in Austria
Expatriate football managers in Portugal
Association football defenders
Nemzeti Bajnokság I managers